The Chennai Open Challenger is a professional tennis tournament played on hard courts. It is currently part of the ATP Challenger Tour. It is held annually in Chennai, India since 2018.

Past finals

Singles

Doubles

ATP Challenger Tour
Hard court tennis tournaments
Sports competitions in Chennai
Tennis tournaments in India
Recurring sporting events established in 2018